Pinnacle Gulch and Shorttail Gulch are coastal access trails served by the same Sonoma County Regional Parks Department parking lot.  The trails provide beach and tidepool access to the Pacific Coast of northern California in the United States.  The trails are located south of Bodega Bay in Sonoma County.  Automobile access from California State Route 1 is via Harbor Way just south
of downtown Bodega Bay, California.  A fee or Sonoma County Regional Parks pass is required for use of the trail head parking lot and rest room.

The  Pinnacle Gulch coastal access trail begins across Mockingbird Road from the parking lot at 20600 Mockingbird in the residential subdivision of Bodega Harbor. Both trails follow steep ravines eroded through Pleistocene marine and marine terrace deposits supporting northern coastal scrub including thick growth of poison oak. The beach is suitable for recreational fishing and swimming at your own risk. It may be possible to hike  along the beach between the two trails at low tide.

See also
List of Sonoma County Regional Parks facilities

References

External links
Pinnacle Gulch Coastal Access Trail official webpage
Shorttail Gulch Coastal Access Trail official webpage

Protected areas of Sonoma County, California